Norwegian Pearl is a  of Norwegian Cruise Line (NCL), launched in 2006, sailing itineraries primarily around Alaska and the Caribbean.

Vessel class
Norwegian Pearl is the third of NCL's four Jewel-class ships. Each ship has different amenities, but has a similar exterior and interior design.

The interior design and amenities, however, are significantly different and merit Norwegian Pearl a Jewel-class designation.

History

The ship's construction began on 3 October 2005, and she was floated out of the Meyer Werft Shipyard covered building dock on 15 October 2006.

The first attempt of the ship's passage under a power line on the Ems River in Germany is claimed to have been the source for the massive power outage that affected first Germany and then all of Europe on late November 4, 2006.

The ship arrived in Southampton, England on 30 November and left on her first voyage with paying passengers on 2 December, travelling to Miami, Florida, where she was based for her first season. She was christened by Rosie O'Donnell in Miami's Port of Miami on 16 December 2006.

Special interest cruises
In February 2008, Norwegian Pearl became home for the Cayamo "A Journey Through Song" 7-day cruise featuring Americana and bluegrass artists from around the world. As many as 42 musical groups provide passengers with special on-board experiences, activities, guest jams, unique collaborations, and multiple performances from each artist. Past artists include Emmy Lou Harris, John Prine, Lyle Lovett, Earl Klugh, John Hiatt, Buddy Miller and Kris Kristofferson.

Norwegian Pearl was featured on the 2009 CNBC documentary Cruise Inc.: Big Money on the High Seas.

Norwegian Pearl has been used by the rock group KISS for their annual KISS Kruise since 2012.

In March 2014, American rock band Paramore embarked on a special three-day event entitled "Parahoy!". The event saw fans embark on a cruise with the band members and featured activities and two concerts.

In February 2015, the ship hosted the annual "Shiprocked" cruise headlining Limp Bizkit, Black Label Society, Buckcherry, and a pre-party headlined by Chevelle. Many other artists and events took place during the cruise both on the ship and on the private island of Great Stirrup Cay.

In January 2016, Norwegian Pearl took to the Caribbean with a ship full of Walker Stalkers, fans of Robert Kirkman's/Skybound Comic's "The Walking Dead". With Sixthman Ninjas leading the way, the first ever "Walker Stalker Cruise" made its maiden voyage from Miami to the island of Freeport Bahamas with celebrity guests from AMC's, The Walking Dead. A second Walker Stalker Cruise took place in February 2017 which called at NCL's private island, Great Stirrup Cay and featured Norman Reedus, Jeffrey Dean Morgan, Greg Nicotero, Tom Payne, Michael Cudlitz, Chandler Riggs, Katelyn Nacon, Michael Traynor, Alana Masterson and Ross Marquand.

The entire Impractical Jokers episode "Cruisin' for a Bruisin'" including all of the challenges and a double punishment of Murr and Joe were filmed on board Norwegian Pearl . The episode aired on May 7, 2015.  The cruise ship was then used as the Impractical Jokers Cruise from 2017 to 2020.

The ship was chartered for a Star Trek-themed cruise in January 2017. The six-night cruise had port calls in Mexico and the Bahamas. Two further chartered Star Trek voyages were planned in January 2018.

In February 2019, American singer, Kesha took the ship for a four-day cruise called, Kesha's Weird and Wonderful Rainbow Ride. The cruise started in Tampa, Florida and ended in Nassau, Bahamas.

In January 2020, the ship held Chris Jericho's Rock 'N' Wrestling Rager at Sea, a 4-day professional wrestling and rock music-themed cruise hosted by Chris Jericho. In partnership with All Elite Wrestling (AEW), the January 22 episode of AEW Dynamite was taped aboard the ship on 21 January while it was docked in Nassau, Bahamas.

In February 2020, she hosted the Outlaw Country Cruise 5, sailing from Key West to Falmouth, Jamaica, with multiple country music artists aboard.

References

External links

 NCL Norwegian Pearl
 Meyer Werft

Ships of Norwegian Cruise Line
Ships built in Papenburg
2006 ships